The discography of Flying Lotus, an experimental multi-genre music producer, laptop musician, and rapper from Los Angeles, California.

Albums

Studio albums

Compilations

Soundtrack

Mixtapes

Demos
2005: July Heat
Note: Various unofficial Flying Lotus demos leaked by fans are sometimes mistaken as official Flying Lotus releases, such as "Raw Cartoons."

Extended plays

Singles

Charted singles

12-inch singles
2006: Pink Sun EP (12", EP) My Room Is White (Flying Lotus Remix) - Plug Research
2008: Cool Out (12") Lost (Flying Lotus Remix) - Hyperdub
2008: Dive EP (12", EP) Blank Blue (Flying Lotus Remix) - Ubiquity Records
2008: Get Dirty EP (12", EP) Game Over (Flying Lotus Remix) - Ghostly International
2008: Natural Selection (Flying Lotus' Cleanse Mix) / Vancouver (2562's Puur Natuur Dub) (12")
2008: Woebegone (CD, Single, Promo) Woebegone (Flying Lotus Remix) - Ninja Tune
2009: Glendale Galleria (12", Single) - Tectonic

Collaborations
2008: "One for Pep Pep (Remix)" (Tim and Eric's Awesome Record, Great Songs! Volume One)
2008: "Testament (w/ Gonjasufi)
2009: "Bootleg Beats" (w/ Samiyam)
2011: "Kryon" (w/ Kode9 & the Spaceape)
2011: "Group Tea" (w/ Matthewdavid)
2011: "Lost" (w/ King Midas Sound)
2012: "Lately" & "Lamented" (w/ Hodgy Beats)
2013: "Dog It" (w/ Jonwayne, Jeremiah Jae)
2013: "Between Villains" (w/ Earl Sweatshirt, Viktor Vaughn & Thundercat)

Mixes
2008: Flying Lotus 'Brainfeeder Radio' Part 2
2009: The Black Fist
2011: Lover's Melt (Stones Throw Podcast)
2011: Lover's Melt Pt. 2 (Brainfeeder Podcast)
2012: Lover's Melt Pt. 3 (Brainfeeder Podcast)
2013: Lover's Melt Pt. 4 (Brainfeeder Podcast)

References

Discographies of American artists
Hip hop discographies
Discography